Napoleon Frederick Rocque (April 22, 1880 – February 5, 1956) was a Canadian ice hockey coach who was active in the United States during the 1910s and 1920s.

Career
Born in Sherbrooke, Rocque played ice hockey as a goaltender in his hometown in Canada before moving to the United States.

Rocque coached hockey at two Ivy League schools: Dartmouth and Yale. At Dartmouth, he coached the likes of Clarence Wanamaker and Lawrence Whitney. The former would succeed him as head coach at the school, as well as at Yale, though not immediately. After Yale, Rocque moved to Boston College, when he was hired by Francis A. Reynolds. While in Boston, Rocque also coached the Boston Arenas and the Boston Athletic Association Unicorns hockey teams. Between 1923 and 1925 he coached in Minneapolis.

Rocque died in Somerville on February 5, 1956, from injuries sustained in an accident six days earlier.

Head coaching record

References

1880 births
1956 deaths
Dartmouth Big Green men's ice hockey coaches
Yale Bulldogs men's ice hockey coaches
Boston College Eagles men's ice hockey coaches
Canadian ice hockey coaches
Canadian expatriates in the United States
Ice hockey people from Quebec
Sportspeople from Sherbrooke
Accidental deaths in Massachusetts